Frederick Widder (1801–1865) was a Canada Company commissioner and son of a Canada Company London director, with family connections to royalty and Anglican figures of influence. His moderate approach and financial innovations for the Canada Company gave him good standing with the pioneers of the Huron Tract and the reformers of Upper Canada. His administrative talents and hard work allowed him to advance past Thomas Mercer Jones and take the lead in the Canada Company.

Widder's home, Lyndhurst, became a social hub of Toronto. His wife, Elizabeth, provided upper-class residents of York with refined entertainments redolent of British aristocratic and middle-class life.

Bibliography

References

Pre-Confederation Quebec people
1801 births
1865 deaths